Shakill's Warrior is an album by David Murray released on the DIW/Columbia label in 1991. It features eight quartet performances by Murray with Stanley Franks, Don Pullen, and Andrew Cyrille.

Critical reception

Reviewing for Playboy in April 1992, Robert Christgau hailed Murray as "the most generous saxophone virtuoso since Sonny Rollins" and Shakill's Warrior "the funkiest record he's ever made", as well as "one of the most evocative". He highlighted the playing of Pullen, saying he and Murray "dig deep into the most declasse kind of organ jazz", and went on to write:

Christgau later ranked Shakill's Warrior as the second best album of 1992 in his year-end "Dean's List" for The Village Voices Pazz & Jop critics poll. In Christgau's Consumer Guide: Albums of the '90s (2000), he assigned the album an A-plus grade, although he later said in 2020, after relistening: "in what may have been the first time in 25 years, one thing became clear quick: not an A plus."

In another retrospective appraisal, AllMusic's Scott Yanow awarded the album 4 stars, stating: "The music, with the exception of some typical Murray outbursts into the extreme upper register, is generally respectful and soulful, one of Murray's mellower efforts.".

Track listing
 "Blues for Savannah" (Murray) – 7:26 
 "Song from the Old Country" (Pullen) – 7:01 
 "High Priest" (Cyrille) – 11:59 
 "In the Spirit" (Pullen) – 9:49 
 "Shakill's Warrior" (Murray) – 8:37 
 "At the Cafe Central" (Pullen) – 10:52 
 "Black February (Butch Morris) – 8:53 
 "Milano Strut" (Pullen) – 8:17

Personnel
David Murray – tenor saxophone
Don Pullen – organ
Stanley Franks – guitar
Andrew Cyrille – drums

References

1991 albums
David Murray (saxophonist) albums
DIW Records albums